Oldřich Kubišta (born 22 July 1960) is a Czech fencer. He competed in the individual and team épée events at the 1980 Summer Olympics.

References

1960 births
Living people
Czech male fencers
Czechoslovak male fencers
Olympic fencers of Czechoslovakia
Fencers at the 1980 Summer Olympics